Pallotti is an Italian surname. Notable people with the surname include:

Alessandra Pallotti (born 1974), Italian women's footballer
Luigi Pallotti (1829–1890), Italian cardinal 
Vincent Pallotti (1795–1850), Italian Catholic priest, saint, founder of the Pallottines

Italian-language surnames
Surnames from given names